DeLancey Divinity School was a seminary of the Episcopal Church in the United States of America located in Geneva, New York, and Buffalo. It was founded in 1850 by William Heathcote DeLancey (1797-1865), first Bishop of the Episcopal Diocese of Western New York as a diocesan seminary at Geneva. The Rev. Dr. William Dexter Wilson (1816-1900) was its first warden, and it operated until 1858. On February 1, 1861, Bishop DeLancey opened a new diocesan school at Geneva under the direction of the Rev. James Rankine (1827-1896). In 1866, it was renamed the DeLancey Divinity School in memory of the founding bishop. DeLancey acquired the library of St. Andrew's Divinity School (Syracuse) in 1906. In 1920 it moved from Geneva to Buffalo. It was closed in 1935 by Bishop Cameron J. Davis.

The centenarian Episcopal priest John Robert Jackson (1913-2013) was believed to be the last living alumnus of DeLancey Divinity School. The former seminary grounds at 234 North Street in Buffalo are now a private residence.

Notable alumni and people
Ivan H. Ball
William Martin Beauchamp
G. Sherman Burroughs, warden 1918-1935
Charles James Burton, alumni association chairman
Norman B. Godfrey
Levi W. Lunn
Robert H. Moore
G. Paul Musselman
William Wirt Raymond
Fayette Royce
Frank L. Titus
Joseph Wayne

References
Charles Wells Hayes, Bishop De Lancey. Address in S. Peter's Memorial Church, Geneva, N.Y., November 2, 1907 on the Occasion of the Translation of his Remains from Mamaroneck (1907)
A Short History of Saint Andrew's Divinity School (1910)

External links
St. Peter's, Geneva history
An Episcopal Dictionary of the Church

Episcopal Church (United States)
Anglican seminaries and theological colleges
Educational institutions established in 1850
Educational institutions disestablished in 1935